The 1977 Manitoba municipal elections were held in October 1977 to elect mayors, councillors and school trustees in various communities throughout Manitoba, Canada.

Cities

Brandon

Jonathan Robin Toogood appears to have been a first-time candidate.
Paul Edward Hudy is an insurance executive.  He was elected to the Brandon City Council in 1974 for Victoria Ward, and was defeated in 1977.  He strongly criticized the federal government of Brian Mulroney in 1987.
Lew Heming appears to have been a first-time candidate.

Towns

Hartney

Allan Lougheed appears to have served as Mayor of Hartney until either 1980 or 1981, when he was replaced by Reg Atkinson.  There is a councillor named Allan Lougheed in the nearby Rural Municipality of Whitewater as of 2007, although this may not be the same person.

Footnotes

Municipal elections in Manitoba
1977 elections in Canada
1977 in Manitoba
October 1977 events in Canada